Abundant Grace Academy is a private senior secondary school located in the centre of Accra, Ghana, established in 1997 by Rev. Charles Ansah-Owusu.

References

External links

Educational institutions established in 1997
1997 establishments in Ghana
High schools in Ghana
Private schools in Africa
Schools in Accra